Gehyra versicolor is a species of gecko endemic to Australia.

References

Gehyra
Reptiles described in 2014
Geckos of Australia